Alam Shah Science School (abbreviated as ASiS) is a boarding science secondary school located in Bandar Tun Razak, Kuala Lumpur, Malaysia. The school was established on 16 June 2003 at the former site of Sultan Alam Shah School, which was relocated to Putrajaya.

History
Sekolah Alam Shah, initially located at Kampung Congo (now Bandar Tun Razak), Cheras, Kuala Lumpur, was relocated after its 40th anniversary in 2003 to a new school complex in Putrajaya. On 16 June 2003, Alam Shah Science School was founded at the site in Bandar Tun Razak, named after the Selangor ruler.

ASiS campus is located in the outskirts of metropolitan Kuala Lumpur, the capital of Malaysia.

Facilities include tennis, futsal and basketball courts, and a football/rugby field shared with Institut Perguruan Ilmu Khas. ASiS is surrounded by education institutions, the Sekolah Menengah Teknik Kuala Lumpur, Sekolah Menengah Sains Selangor, Sekolah Menengah Kebangsaan Cheras, Institut Perguruan Ilmu Khas, Institut Perguruan Teknik, and the Hospital Universiti Kebangsaan Malaysia. KL Football Stadium, the venue of ASiS' Annual Athletics Day, is also nearby.

The first batch of students, sat for the Sijil Pelajaran Malaysia SPM in 2004 with 84 candidates. Each enrolment may cater for over 200 boys and is divided into three intakes.

The first principal was Tn. Hj. Mohd Idrus bin Abdul Hamid, who officially took up the position on the same day ASiS was inaugurated. The administration board remained unchanged until 2011, when Mohd Idrus retired after eight years. The initial faculty comprised thirteen teachers; some of them, like Mohd Idrus, were previously teachers at Sekolah Alam Shah. On 12 September 2003, 12 more teachers were hired. In 2009, there were 51 ASiS teachers and 22 staff. The number of students reached around 500.

Principals

School Housing System
ASiS students are divided into four houses. Their placement in the hostel is made according to their respective houses. The houses compete for House of the Year award during the annual Nostalgia Abadi Dinner, a graduation dinner.

Performance
ASiS is in the top ten SBPs in SPM examinations since 2004. Nationwide, ASiS places itself in the top ten schools. On 17 February 2011, in an announcement made by Education Minister Muhyiddin Yassin, ASiS was conferred the status High Performance School, or Sekolah Berprestasi Tinggi (SBT), with 22 other schools.

Others

Co-Curriculums
ASiS has three Niche Areas in their co-curriculums. They are: 
1. Science & Innovation 
2. English Debate  
3. Internationalisation Programme

English Debate
The highest ranking debating competition between the student of Fully Residential School is The Prime Minister's Cup (PPM). In this competition, ASiS was the champion in year 2007, 2013 and was the first runner-up in year 2016.

References

External links
 
 http://oasiskl.blogspot.com, Old Boys Association of ASiS' blog

Secondary schools in Kuala Lumpur
2003 establishments in Malaysia
Educational institutions established in 2003
Boys' schools in Malaysia